My Little Lover is a Japanese pop group belonging to the Avex Trax label as of the single  and the album Akko. Previous releases were under Toy's Factory. The group has had several members, but currently only Akko (Akamatsu Akiko 赤松亜希子, born Akamatsu 赤松) the vocalist, remain. 

(The lyricist KATE on their early singles stands for "Kenji, Akko, and Takeshi Ensemble".) Akko and Kobayashi married in 1996, but divorced in 2008 when Kobayashi's affair with Yo Hitoto was made public. Fujii retired from the group in 2002.

Discography

Original albums
1995: Evergreen
1998: Presents
1998: New Adventure
1998: The Waters
2001: Topics
2002: Organic
2004: Fantasy
2006: Akko
2008: 
2008: Acoakko
2009: 
2010: Acoakko Debut
2015: re:evergreen

Compilation albums
2001: Singles
2004: Self Collection: 15 Currents
2010: Best Collection

Singles
1995: "Man & Woman/My Painting"
1995: 
1995: "Hello, Again (Mukashi Kara Aru Basho)"
1996: "Alice"
1996: 
1996: "Yes (Free Flower)"
1997: "Animal Life"
1997: "Shuffle"
1997: "Private Eyes"
1998: 
1998: "Destiny"
1998: "Crazy Love/Days"
2001: 
2001: 
2002: "Survival"
2004: 
2006: 
2007: 
2007: "Dreamy Success"
2008: 
2008: 
2009: 
2009: "Blue Sky"
2011: ひこうき雲
2015: ターミナル

Video & DVD
1998: Sign of Thursday
2001: Clips

External links 
Official Website
J!-ENT Interviews My Little Lover Special J!-ENT interview with My Little Lover by Dennis A. Amith and Hiroshi Tagawa.

Japanese rock music groups
Musical groups established in 1995